MDFMK was an industrial rock band formed by two members of KMFDM, Sascha Konietzko and Tim Sköld. Lucia Cifarelli, formerly of the band Drill, later joined to make a trio.

History
Due to "differences in vision and drive", KMFDM disbanded in 1999. Sascha Konietzko and Skold continued working together under the name MDFMK. Konietzko was living in New York at the time, and auditioned female singers to provide vocals for the album. Through this process, he selected Lucia Cifarelli (formerly of the band Drill). The trio released only one album: MDFMK (2000, Universal Records). All three shared vocal duties on the album. Their song "Missing Time" was used in the animated movie Heavy Metal 2000.

The band toured the United States and Canada in 2000, during which it had a fourth member, a giant robot guitarist named Zyclor. 

Konietzko stated in 2003 that there was material for what he called "MDFMK #2", but that Universal Records was "sitting on it". He also said that if Universal never released the material, he would eventually buy the rights to it and release it himself.

Discography

Albums
MDFMK (2000)

Other
Gravity Games 2000: Summer Sounds, Vol. 1 (2000)

References

External links
 KMFDM official website
 [ MDFMK discography on Billboard official website]

KMFDM
Musical groups established in 1999
Musical groups disestablished in 2002
Industrial rock musical groups
German industrial music groups
1999 establishments in Germany